Aichi 5th district is a constituency of the House of Representatives in the Diet of Japan (national legislature). It is located in Aichi Prefecture and consists of Nagoya's Nakamura and Nakagawa wards, the cities of Kiyosu and Kitanagoya and the Nishikasugai district. As of 2016, 428,423 eligible voters were registered in the district. The current representative of this district is Vice Speaker Hirotaka Akamatsu of the Constitutional Democratic Party.

Nagoya is considered a "Democratic kingdom" (minshu ōkoku), a stronghold of the Democratic Party of Japan (DPJ). But Aichi's 5th district is the only electoral district in Nagoya (Aichi 1 to 5) that also contains areas outside Nagoya. In the landslide "postal privatization" election of 2005, it became the first district in Nagoya that the long-ruling Liberal Democratic Party (LDP) could win since the introduction of single-member districts in 1996: Liberal Democrat Takahide Kimura won narrowly against the Democratic incumbent Akamatsu who was then only reelected in the Tōkai proportional representation block. Akamatsu had represented Aichi's 5th district since 1996 and regained the seat in the 2009 general election. He was Minister of Agriculture, Forestry and Fisheries in the Hatoyama Cabinet. In 2012, he lost the district by less than 2,000 votes to Liberal Democrat Kenji Kanda. Akamatsu regained the district in 2014 and has held it until the present.

List of representatives

Election results

References 

Aichi Prefecture
Districts of the House of Representatives (Japan)
1994 establishments in Japan